MPE (Multi-Programming Executive) is a discontinued business-oriented mainframe computer real-time operating system made by Hewlett-Packard.  While initially a mini-mainframe, the final high-end systems supported 12 CPUs and over 2000 simultaneous users.

Description 
It runs on the HP 3000 family of computers, which originally used HP custom 16-bit stack architecture CISC CPUs and were later migrated to PA-RISC where the operating system was called MPE XL.

In 1983, the original version of MPE was written in a language called SPL (System Programming Language). MPE XL was written primarily in Pascal, with some assembly language and some of the old SPL code.

In 1992, the OS name was changed to MPE/iX to indicate Unix interoperability with the addition of POSIX compatibility. The discontinuance of the product line was announced in late 2001, with support from HP terminating at the end of 2010. A number of 3rd party companies still support both the hardware and software.

In 2002 HP released the last version  MPE/iX 7.5.

Commands 
Among others, MPE/iX supports the following list of common commands and programs.

 =SHUTDOWN
 BASIC
 CHDIR
 COPY
 DEBUG
 ECHO
 ELSE
 EXIT
 FORTRAN
 HELP
 IF
 PASCAL
 PRINT
 RENAME
 SH
 WHILE

See also 
 HP 3000

References

External links 
 Allegro Consultants, Inc. Free HP 3000 Software, MPE Software Support
 Beechglen Development Inc. MPE Software Support
 HP MPE/iX homepage
 HP MPE/iX Command reference
 openMPE  Advocates of continued MPE and IMAGE source code access beyond 2010

Discontinued operating systems
Multi-Programming Executive
Proprietary operating systems
1974 software